The African house snake (Boaedon fuliginosus) is a species of snake of the family Lamprophiidae. Harmless to humans, it is widely kept and bred in captivity as a pet by herpetoculturists due to its small size, placid demeanor and easy care requirements.

Geographic range
The snake is found in Africa, mainly preferring relatively drier areas as habitat.

References 
See Boaedon capensis as it is the same species

Reptiles described in 1827
Reptiles of Africa
Lamprophiidae